In enzymology, an asparagine-tRNA ligase is an enzyme that catalyzes the chemical reaction

ATP + L-asparagine + tRNAAsn  AMP + diphosphate + L-asparaginyl-tRNAAsn

The 3 substrates of this enzyme are ATP, L-asparagine, and tRNA(Asn), whereas its 3 products are AMP, diphosphate, and L-asparaginyl-tRNA(Asn).

This enzyme belongs to the family of ligases, to be specific those forming carbon-oxygen bonds in aminoacyl-tRNA and related compounds.  The systematic name of this enzyme class is L-asparagine:tRNAAsn ligase (AMP-forming). Other names in common use include asparaginyl-tRNA synthetase, asparaginyl-transfer ribonucleate synthetase, asparaginyl transfer RNA synthetase, asparaginyl transfer ribonucleic acid synthetase, asparagyl-transfer RNA synthetase, and asparagine translase.  This enzyme participates in alanine and aspartate metabolism and aminoacyl-trna biosynthesis.

Structural studies

References

 

EC 6.1.1
Enzymes of known structure